Euller is a given name. It may refer to:

 Euller (footballer, born 1971), Euller Elias de Carvalho, Brazilian football forward
 Euller (footballer, born 1995), Elosman Euller Silva Cavalcanti, Brazilian football left-back

See also
 Euler (disambiguation)